Rolando Antonio Pérez Fernández (b. Santiago de Cuba, Cuba, 1947) is a Cuban musicologist, cellist and professor.

Academic background

Rolando Pérez initiated his musical Studies in Santiago de Cuba, where he also began his career as cellist under the guidance of distinguished performer and professor Ernesto Xancó. In 1976 he graduated from Music Medium Level in the specialty of violoncello at Havana Municipal Conservatory “Amadeo Roldán”. This same year, after the inauguration of the Instituto Superior de Arte (ISA) and the School of Musicology in the same educational institution, Rolando Pérez began his studies in that area, which was founded by Cuban musicologist Argeliers León, after concluding his Studies, Rolando Pérez received the degree of “Licenciado en Música con especialización en Musicología” from the Instituto Superior de Arte (ISA). In 1999, he also received the degree of “Doctor en Ciencias del Arte,” from the same educational institution.

Work as cellist

Rolando Pérez served as cellist in the Cuban National Symphony Orchestra from 1969 to 1981, as well as between 1987 and 1992.
He has also participated in ensembles and recordings of concert and popular music such as: Cuarteto de cuerdas by Carlos Malcolm, and “El ropavejero,” by Francisco Barrios “El Mastuerzo”,together with the Mexican rock’n roll group “Botellita de Jerez”.

Work as musicologist

As musicological researcher, Rolando Pérez has collaborated with the “Centro de Investigación y Desarrollo de la Música Cubana” from 1981 to 1987. He has also participated as speaker in numerous congresses and lectures, among which we can mention the following: “Coloquio Interdisciplinario sobre Ritmo, Universidad de Salamanca (1993),” “Encuentro Latinoamericano sobre Religión y Etnicidad, Universidad Javeriana, Bogotá (1996),” “International Conference ‘’Musical Cultures of Latin America: Global Effects, Past and Present,’’ UCLA (1999),” “Society for Ethnomusicology South East and Caribbean Chapter Annual Meeting, FSU, Tallahassee, Florida (2002),” “Congreso Internacional de la Asociación Latinoamericana de Estudios Afroasiáticos, UNAM/Colegio de México, México DF (2003),” “Congreso de la IASPM Rama Latinoamericana, La Habana 2006,” and the “II Congreso Venezolano de Música Popular, Caracas (2006).”

Work as professor

From 1993 until the present, Rolando Pérez has worked as professor in the area of Ethnomusicology at the National School of Music of the “Universidad Nacional Autónoma de México” (UNAM), where he currently holds a tenure as “Profesor de Tiempo Completo, Titular ‘A’ Interino.”

Publications

Throughout his long career as musicologist and researcher, Rolando Pérez has published the following books: ‘’La binarización de los ritmos ternarios africanos en América Latina’’ (Casa de las Américas, La Habana, 1987) and ‘’La música afromestiza mexicana’’ (Universidad Veracruzana, Xalapa (Veracruz), 1990). In the first of those books (which won the musicology award from Cuban cultural institution “Casa de las Américas” in 1982), he proposes a theory which is deeply rooted in the musicological problematic of Latin America and a methodology which could be developed in comparative studies created within the Continent. The text is comprised by three chapters in which the author begins by analyzing general aspects related to the presence of the African population in Latin America, his contributions to music and to the socio-historical context within which those processes have evolved. In the second chapter he describes in detail the characteristics of the African rhythm style and its fusion with the Hispanic style. In the third chapter he develops his own personal conclusions about what he describes as: “the binarization process of the African ternary rhythms”, their specific behavior and the consequences of this process for the cultural development of the musical culture in Cuba and Latin America. His reflections are illustrated with numerous musical examples. In his second book, Pérez Fernández intends to demonstrate the importance of the African contribution to the integration of the music of Mexico, as well as to provide facts that may support, within the musicological field, the conclusions of Mexican anthropologist Gonzalo Aguirre Beltrán in reference to the concept that the Mexican creole music is fundamentally a result of the cultural fusion between the Spanish and the African population.

In addition, this author has written numerous articles and book chapters, not just focused in the African musical contributions in Latino America, but also extending his interest to Linguistics, Epistemology and History, as well as to the contribution of the Chinese musical traditions to the Cuban culture.
 
In those areas of study we should mention works such as:

 La corneta china (suona) en Cuba: Una contribución asiática trascendente. 
 De China a Cuba: una mirada a su etnomusicología. 
 El culto a la Guadalupe entre los indios de El Caney.
 Notas en torno al origen kimbundu de la voz fandango. 
 El verbo chingar: una palabra clave. 
 El Chuchumbé y la buena palabra. (partes 1 y 2).

The outstanding work of Pérez Fernández constitutes an important point of reference for current and future investigations focusing on the study of the African influence in the music of Latin America. In this regard, his ideas, articles and books have been commented, quoted and reviewed within and outside the American Continent by several prominent researchers such as: Steven Loza, James Robbins, José Jorge de Carvalho, Isabel Aretz, Kofi Agawu, Ángel G. Quintero Rivera, Juan Pablo González, Antonio García de León, Helmut Enrique Greiner, Carlos Reynoso and Gonzalo Aguirre Beltrán, among others.

See also
 Music of Cuba

References

Cuban cellists
1947 births
Living people
Cuban musicologists
People from Havana